The British Library Board (Power to Borrow) Act 2021 (2021 c. 15) is an Act of the Parliament of the United Kingdom. The Act allows the board of the British Library (which is a non-departmental public body) to borrow money.

Provisions
The provisions of the Act are:

The amendment of the British Library Act 1972 to remove a clause which prohibited the Library's board from being able to borrow money.

Timetable
The Act was introduced in the House of Commons as a private member's bill by Bim Afolami, the Conservative MP for Hitchin and Harpenden, in February 2020. It had its second reading in March and was passed to the committee stage by September. The bill had its third reading on 12 March 2021, passing to the House of Lords the same day. It had its second reading in the Lords on 19 March and its third on 26 April, with the need for committee stage being discharged. Its final reading was on 26 April and it gained royal assent on 29 April 2021.

See also

Private Members' Bills in the Parliament of the United Kingdom

References

United Kingdom Acts of Parliament 2021
British Library
Library law
2021 in British law